Girls is an American comedy-drama television series created by Lena Dunham, who serves as executive producer along with Judd Apatow and Jenni Konner. The series premiered on HBO on April 15, 2012. Girls stars Dunham as Hannah Horvath, an aspiring writer in her 20s trying to navigate her personal and professional life in New York City after her parents discontinue their financial support. Allison Williams, Jemima Kirke, Zosia Mamet, Adam Driver, and Alex Karpovsky co-star as Hannah's circle of friends, who are also trying to figure out their own lives and relationships.

Series overview

Episodes

Season 1 (2012)

Season 2 (2013)

Season 3 (2014)

Season 4 (2015)

Season 5 (2016)

Season 6 (2017)

Ratings

References

External links 
 
 

Lists of American comedy-drama television series episodes
Lists of American sitcom episodes
Lists of sex comedy television series episodes